Trupiano v. United States, 334 U.S. 699 (1948), was a US Supreme Court decision that ruled that warrantless searches following arrests were unconstitutional under the Fourth Amendment to the United States Constitution.

The case involved a warrantless raid by law enforcement on an illegal distillery, before which law enforcement had had sufficient time to obtain warrants but had chosen not to. After the raid, evidence was seized. In a majority opinion authored by Justice Frank Murphy, the Court ruled that this seizure had been a violation of the Fourth Amendment:
It is a cardinal rule that, in seizing goods and articles, law enforcement agents must secure and use search warrants whenever reasonably practicable. This rule rests upon the desirability of having magistrates rather than police officers determine when searches and seizures are permissible and what limitations should be placed upon such activities.

Trupiano was overturned only two years later in United States v. Rabinowitz (1950), which allowed law enforcement to search and seize evidence at the site of an arrest.

References

External links 
 

1948 in United States case law
United States Fourth Amendment case law
United States Supreme Court cases
United States Supreme Court cases of the Vinson Court